Katsu! (stylized as KATSU!) is a Japanese manga series written and illustrated by Mitsuru Adachi. It centers on a freshman student, Katsuki Satoyama, as he discovers his near-legendary skill in boxing. It was serialized in Shogakukan's Weekly Shōnen Sunday from August 2001 to March 2005, with its chapters collected in sixteen tankōbon volumes.

Plot 

Katsuki Satoyama and his best friend Kyōta Kawakami, both age 15, enroll in Mizutani Boxing Gym to get close to their tomboyish crush, Katsuki Mizutani, whose father owns it. However, Satoyama soon finds out that she is distant from her father. Worse, it turns out that she hates boxing.

In a sparring match, everyone soon discovers Satoyama's hidden, yet unpolished, skill in boxing. Satoyama soon learns that Mizutani is really in love with boxing, but disdains it because it's a man's sport in which she cannot participate. Mizutani then takes it upon herself to be Satoyama's trainer and manager in order to reach the championship belt. Satoyama complies to be closer to his crush.

Satoyama is the son of Akamatsu and brought up by Rabbit Sakaguchi. He has the advantage of learning from both fathers - one through blood and other by being brought up by him.

The rest of the story shows his transformation of choosing boxing from a way to impress Mizutani to actually loving it and finally embracing it completely and becoming a pro boxer.

A slew of rivals who later turn into friends and well-wishers help him in this journey.

Characters

Main 

A junior at Kōyō High School where he excels at Classical Chinese. His mother died five years before the story begins. He and his friend Kyōta join Mizutani Boxing Gym with the ulterior motive of getting closer to Katsuki Mizutani, whose father owns the gym. He is very good at dodging due to his sister's love of throwing things at him when she was little. While he initially believes he is a bantamweight, it turns out his scales at home are off by three kilograms, and he is actually a featherweight.
His biological father, Ryūsuke Akamatsu, and his adoptive father who raised him, Hachigorō Satoyama, have two completely different boxing styles, and Katsuki has inherited traits of each style, incorporating them into his own unique style.
Katsuki won both the inter-high school championships and the National Sports Festival championship titles twice each, as well as the overall high school championship once, for a total of five titles. He has also sparred twice with Katsuki Mizutani and once with Shūsaku Nikaidō (who is in a different weight class). He defeats Shinichi Misaki twice in unofficial matches and remains undefeated on and off the record since he officially started boxing.
After failing the entrance exam to enter college, he obtained his professional boxing license.

A classmate of Katsuki Satoyama. She has a very strong personality and has single-handedly taken down groups of bullies and hoodlums multiple times, especially when she was younger and protecting Kimoto Takamichi from them. Daughter of Tsuyoshi and Harune Mizutani, who divorced several years ago. Initially shows great disgust and repulsion towards boxing. She takes special interest in training Katsuki Satoyama after sparring with him. She is the object of affection for Satoyama, Kyouta Kawakami, Takamichi Kimoto and Shinichi Misaki. Was childhood friends with Takamichi Kimoto. She also has feelings towards Satoyama and dislikes Misaki stalking her. Her rival for Satoyama is Riko Nanjo who has the same feelings for him.

Katsuki Satoyama's best friend in middle and high school. A talented boxer in his own right, who enjoys the sport and learns well at Mizutani Gym. He likes Katsuki Mizutani and initially joined the gym in order to get closer to her. Occasionally wants to test his strength against Katsuki Satoyama. He had a girlfriend who dumps him quickly.

Father of Katsuki Satoyama and Chiyaki Satoyama. Formerly a pro boxer known as "Rabbit Sakaguchi", but took his wife's surname when he married and retired. His last match as a professional boxer was against Ryūsuke Akamatsu, the biological father of Satoyama Katsuki. The match proved to be fatal for Akamatsu, who died 1 month later after the event. A widower of some years, who occasionally likes to flirt. He was maneuvered into taking a job as the coach of the Kouyou High School boxing club, where both Katsukis are. He was known for his defensive, point-scoring style of boxing. His professional boxing record is 12-0-10.
Tsuyoshi Mizutani
(male) Former Oriental champion, and owner of Mizutani Gym. Father of Katsuki Mizutani and ex-husband of Harune Mizutani. Tends to drink and get violent a lot, but loves his daughter and is quite protective of her. He has a grudge against the pro boxer named "Rabbit" Sakaguchi, who defeated him twice due to disqualification. He also prefers the hard-hitting, give-and-take style of boxing.
Chiyaki Satoyama
Younger sister of Katsuki Satoyama and daughter of Hachigorou Satoyama. Quite clumsy, and also loves to throw things at people, which trained others in the household to dodge very well. Quite a helpful, friendly little girl who occasionally teases her brother. Admires Shinichi Misaki, the ace pitcher.
Harune Mizutani
Mother of Katsuki Mizutani, and the parent she lives with. Divorced her husband a few years ago on grounds of drunkenness and violence. Runs an okonomiyaki restaurant that the Satoyamas sometimes patronise. Hates boxers and will not allow them to eat at her shop. Tells everyone she is a widow, rather than divorced.
Takamichi Kimoto
(male) Childhood friend of Katsuki Mizutani, who was very often bullied. Admired Katsuki a lot when she defended him, but regrets that doing so forced her to become a tomboy. Took up boxing to be able to defeat her and allow her to act like a girl again, and became very very good at it. Has a crush on her, and is Katsu Satoyama's first major rival. Belongs to the Asakura High Boxing club.
Tadashi Sakura
(male) One of the pro boxers training regularly at Mizutani Gym. A great admirer and fan of Rabbit Sakaguchi, and the person who revealed his identity to Tsuyoshi Mizutani. An advocate of the defensive, point-scoring style as well. Was the first person to give Katsu tips on how to box properly
Shuusaku Nikaidou
(male) A boxer who formerly trained at the Mizutani Gym, but who was sent to juvenile detention for a couple of years. Defeated Sakura when he was just a middle-schooler. Now wants to earn his pro license. Former childhood friend of Katsuki Satoyama, and a bully to Kyouta Kawakami. Has a liking for Katsuki Mizutani as well.
Minori Hanzawa
(female) A former classmate of Katsuki Satoyama and Kyouta Kawakami in middle school. Has a liking for Katsu and always tries to get him to go on dates with her. Views Katsuki Mizutani as a rival, and a violent girl. Studies at the same high school as Takamichi Kimoto, and gives Satoyama valuable information about his boxing style.
Shinichi Misaki
(male) An ace baseball pitcher who made it to Koshien and back. Took up boxing as a change of sport, but also as a dream of following in his idol's footsteps. Falls for Katsuki Mizutani when he meets her, and announces it to the world. Good friends with Jin Uchida since childhood. Is a genius boxer in his own right, and is Katsuki Satoyama's major rival in the series. He and Jin greatly admired Ryūsuke Akamatsu as their childhood hero. His boxing style is completely base from coping Akamatsu off of the tv, causing him to be a southpaw. Gives up his dream of boxing and rejoins baseball for money due to family's financial problems.
Jin Uchida
A young man who chose work and training for a pro boxing license over high school. Trains at Kouei Gym, where Rabbit Sakaguchi formerly trained at as well. Has a dark and serious appearance, and is extremely, violently dangerous when provoked. A good friend of Shinichi Misaki since childhood. Goes to jail and has to let go of boxing after punching his dad for sabotaging Misaki's family.

(male) The manager of the Kouei Gym, where Rabbit Sakaguchi used to train, and where Jin Uchida is training now. Is friendly and helpful towards both Katsukis because of his relationship with Hachigorou Satoyama. Also knows the reason behind Rabbit Sakaguchi's retirement.

(male?) Former manager of the Shoken Gym, where a great boxing star Ryuusuke Akamatsu trained. Runs a soba shop now. Has a granddaughter, Riko Nanjo.

Granddaughter of the former manager of Shoken Gym. She seems to have loved Ryūsuke Akamatsu since she was a child and after seeing Satoyama, she decides to seduce him to become pro and then marry him, which angers Mizutani greatly because of her jealousy. She plans to re-open the Shoken Gym.

Publication
Katsu! is written and illustrated by Mitsuru Adachi. The manga was serialized in Shogakukan's Weekly Shōnen Sunday from August 22, 2001 to March 2, 2005. Shogakukan collected its chapters in sixteen tankōbon volumes, released from February 18, 2002 to April 18, 2005.

Volume list

References

External links 
 

2002 manga
Boxing in anime and manga
Mitsuru Adachi
Shōnen manga